Nebahat or Nabahat is a feminine Turkish given name of Arabic origin meaning awakened or honor. 

Notable people with the name include:

 Nebahat Çehre (born 1944), Turkish actress, singer, and model
 Nebahat Akkoç (born 1956), Turkish women's rights activist
 Nebahat Albayrak (born 1968), Turkish-Dutch politician
 Nabahat Jah Begum, one of the daughters of Muhammad Khair ud-din Mirza, Khurshid Jah Bahadur recognised as head of the Timurid dynasty in India

References

Turkish feminine given names